Mark Riley may refer to:
 Mark Anthony Riley, British physicist
 Mark Riley (American radio host) (born 1951), American broadcaster
 Mark Riley (Australian rules coach) (born 1963), Australian rules football coach
 Mark Riley (journalist), Australian television reporter
 Mark Riley (rugby league) (born 1967), former scrum half

See also
 Marc Riley (born 1961), British radio host
Mark Reilly (disambiguation)